The 2010 ARCA Racing Series presented by Re/MAX and Menards was the 58th season of the ARCA Racing Series. The season began on February 6 with the Lucas Oil Slick Mist 200 and ended on October 9 with the American 200 presented by Black's Tire and Auto Service. Patrick Sheltra of Sheltra Motorsports won the season championship.

This season was notable for the season-opening race, the 2010 Lucas Oil Slick Mist 200 at Daytona, which had the largest audience of any ARCA event in the history of the series with 2.4 million viewers tuning in on the Speed Channel. The high viewership was due to the fact that Danica Patrick was competing in the event, which was her first stock car start as part of her move from the IndyCar Series to NASCAR. This garnered a lot more media coverage for the ARCA Series and attention to the series as a whole by race fans starting that year.

Teams and drivers
Note: If under "team", the owner's name is listed and in italics, that means the name of the race team that fielded the car is unknown.

Complete schedule

Limited schedule

Notes

Schedule

Changes
A second road course was added to the schedule with the February 27 race at Palm Beach International Raceway.

Results and standings

Drivers' championship

(key) Bold – Pole position awarded by time. Italics – Pole position set by final practice results or rainout. * – Most laps led.

References

External links
2010 ARCA Racing Series Results at Racing-Reference

ARCA
ARCA Menards Series seasons